Parliamentary elections were held in Zimbabwe in June and July 1985. The result was a victory for the ruling ZANU–PF party led by Robert Mugabe, which increased its majority in parliament.

Electoral system
The House of Assembly consisted of 100 seats, 20 of which were reserved for white voters, and the remaining 80 were elected on a 'common roll' consisting of all adult citizens except those on the white roll. Since Zimbabwean independence in 1980, an electoral roll for the common roll seats had been compiled. Single-member constituencies were drawn up for the common roll seats instead of election by lists in regions used in the 1980 elections. The common roll seats were elected on 1–2 July.

The white roll seats had been drawn up in 1978 but the large exodus of white Zimbabweans (especially from rural areas) had led to a wide disparity in electorate sizes. The Delimitation Commission therefore redrew the map and renamed many of the seats to match changes in place names. Another change to the system was that preferential voting was reinstituted for the white roll seats, so that a candidate had to win more than half of the votes (after transfers) to be elected. The white roll seats were elected on 27 June.

Campaign

Common roll
The previous election had shown that ZANU (PF) had monopolised popular support among the Shona areas, and the chances of it losing the election were minimal. However, ZANU (PF) needed to affirm its support and demonstrate that it retained the confidence of the people that it was making genuine progress. Popular support for PF-ZAPU, outside the Ndebele areas, was minimal, and the United African National Council of Abel Muzorewa had lost support to ZANU (PF) following the effective transition into government of Robert Mugabe.

White roll
The white MPs in the previous Assembly, who had all started off as members of the Rhodesian Front (later renamed the Republican Front), had split over their reaction to the ZANU (PF) government with more than half resigning their membership in March 1982 to become Independents who partially supported ZANU (PF). Eventually, in April 1985, the Independent Zimbabwe Group was formed in preparation for the election. Generally, whites in Harare and Bulawayo had little complaint about the conduct of government, having seen minimal change in their lifestyles.

There was therefore a genuine contest in the Zimbabwean white community between the Conservative Alliance of Zimbabwe (the renamed Rhodesian Front), advocating strong defence of white interests, and the Independent Zimbabwe Group, advocating conciliation and partnership with ZANU (PF).

Conduct
There was violence and Ndebele–Shona ethnic animosities during the elections.

Results

By constituency

Common roll

White roll

Changes during the Assembly

In the delayed poll in Kariba constituency, two candidates were nominated: Kenneth Madzvanya Mano (PF-ZAPU) and Enos Mzombi Nkala (ZANU (PF)). Nkala subsequently withdrew, although a poll was required (it took place on 5–7 July) and Mano was declared elected.

Charles Duke (CAZ, Highlands) joined ZANU (PF) in June 1986.

Ian Smith (CAZ, Bulawayo Central) was suspended from the Assembly for one year on 2 April 1987 over statements he had made in South Africa which were critical of the Mugabe government.

Three members elected from the white roll constituencies joined ZANU (PF) on 28 July 1987. They were John Landau (IZG, Avondale), Jock Kay (IZG, Makoni), and Tony Read (Ind, Borrowdale).

In September 1987, having achieved the support of 75% of the House of Assembly as required under the Lancaster House Agreement, the constitution was amended to abolish the white roll constituencies. Twenty further members (including many of the former white MPs who were supportive of ZANU (PF)) were co-opted onto the House of Assembly to replace them.

References

 Zimbabwe Government Gazette, 17 June 1985 (candidates)
 Zimbabwe Government Gazette, 12 July 1985 (elected members)
 Zimbabwe Herald (election results)
 Sunday Mail (election results)

Elections in Zimbabwe
1985 in Zimbabwe
Zimbabwe
Election and referendum articles with incomplete results